Pooja Dey is an Indian actress who works in Bollywood film industry.

Career 
Dey hails from Guwahati, Assam . She has started her acting career with the show Dating in the Dark. After that she has acted in Gandii Baat. Her upcoming web series is Maaya 4.

Works
 Dating in the Dark
 Gandii Baat
 Gilli Jhilli 
 Maaya 4

References

External links 
 

Living people
Indian film actresses
Actresses in Hindi television
Year of birth missing (living people)